Dork Sahagian is an Armenian American climate scientist. He is the Director of the Environmental Initiative at Lehigh University in Bethlehem, Pennsylvania. He invented a technique for calculating the Earth's air pressure in the past, based on the difference in the size of the bubbles in cooled volcanic lava.

References

External links
 

American people of Armenian descent
Living people
Year of birth missing (living people)
Place of birth missing (living people)
American climatologists
People from Bethlehem, Pennsylvania